Hope Bagot is a civil parish in Shropshire, England.  It contains twelve listed buildings that are recorded in the National Heritage List for England.  Of these, one is listed at Grade I, the highest of the three grades, and the others are at Grade II, the lowest grade.  The parish contains the village of Hope Bagot and the surrounding countryside.  The oldest building in the parish is St John the Baptist's Church; this and four memorials in the churchyard are listed.  The other listed buildings are houses, the oldest of which are timber framed and date from the 17th century.


Key

Buildings

References

Citations

Sources

Lists of buildings and structures in Shropshire